The Medical Marijuana Assistance Program of America (MMAPA) was founded in 2009 in Denver, Colorado, and worked to raise awareness and remove the negative social stigma associated with a patient's choice in medicine, namely medical marijuana. MMAPA is the nation's first alternative treatment preferred provider organization (AT-PPO) whose mission is to make alternative treatment accessible and affordable for disabled veterans, hospice patients, and the indigent.

In early 2010, the MMAPA acquired and refurbished a 1968 Airstream Overlander International and launched Mobile Doctors of America to ensure patients had access to affordable physicians willing to recommend patients medical marijuana throughout Colorado.  In February 2010, CNN toured with the staff of MMAPA and MDARX to document this first of its kind, controversial service in Salida, Colorado.  Later that year, MDARX was covered by Saturday Night Live's "In the News" segment hosted by Seth Meyers.

As of April 30, 2012, the MMAPA has shut down, and is no longer providing benefits or services to its members.

References

High Times
Huffington Post
Huffington Post
Coloradoan.com 

Medicinal use of cannabis organizations based in the United States
Organizations established in 2009
2009 in cannabis